was an experimental, modernist Japanese writer.

Yokomitsu began publishing in dōjinshi such as Machi ("Street") and Tō ("Tower") after entering Waseda University in 1916. In 1923, he published Nichirin ("The Sun"), Hae ("A Fly") and more in the magazine Bungeishunjū, which made his name popular. The following year he started the magazine Bungei-Jidai with Yasunari Kawabata and others. Yokomitsu and others involved in Bungei-Jidai were known collectively as the Shinkankakuha, or the New Sensation School, with a particular interest in sensation and scientific objectivity.

References

External links
 
 Synopsis of Shanghai (Shanhai) at JLPP (Japanese Literature Publishing Project) 

1898 births
1947 deaths
Writers from Fukushima Prefecture
20th-century Japanese writers
20th-century Japanese male writers